Elachista aspila is a moth of the family Elachistidae. It is found in North America in Washington, Alberta and Oregon.

The length of the forewings is 5.1–5.8 mm. The forewings are unicolorous creamy white. The hindwings are light grey and translucent. The underside of the forewings is dark grey and the underside of the hindwings is light grey.

Etymology
The species name is derived from Greek aspilos (meaning spotless).

References

Moths described in 1997
aspila
Moths of North America